Daniel Robert Middleton (born 8 November 1991), better known online as DanTDM (formerly TheDiamondMinecart), is a British YouTuber and gamer known for his video game commentaries. His online video channels have covered many video games including Minecraft, Roblox, Pokémon and Sonic the Hedgehog.

His channel has been listed among the top YouTube channels in the United Kingdom. In July 2015, he was listed as one of the most popular YouTubers in the world by viewership. He has won several Kids' Choice Awards and set Guinness World Records for his gaming and presenting. In 2017, Middleton topped the Forbes list of Highest-Paid YouTube Stars, earning $16.5 million (about ) in one year. As of March 2023, his YouTube channel has reached over 26.6 million subscribers, 19 billion video views, and has posted over 3,500 videos.

Personal life
Daniel Robert Middleton was born on 8 November 1991 in Aldershot, England, as the elder of two siblings. His parents divorced when he was a child. He attended the University of Northampton where he studied music production.

Middleton married his girlfriend, Jemma, in March 2013. Their first son, Asher, was born on 5 January 2020. Their second son, Miles, was born on 22 November 2022.

Career

In 2012, Middleton created TheDiamondMinecart, a gaming channel. He changed his channel's name to TheDiamondMinecart // DanTDM, and then, on 12 December 2016, to DanTDM. He currently produces videos out of his home studio in Wellingborough. Middleton's content is largely targeted at children.

He released a graphic novel called Trayaurus and the Enchanted Crystal on 6 October 2016. The novel remained at the number one spot on The New York Times Best Seller list for hardcover graphic books for eleven weeks. He was a featured guest at the Cheltenham Literature Festival and went on a book tour that included parts of the UK and a visit to New York City. In 2017, he embarked on a tour through the United States and Australia.

In 2017, he starred in a web series called DanTDM Creates a Big Scene starring himself and featuring other social media entertainers and actors. The series premiered on 7 April 2017 exclusively for YouTube Red (now called YouTube Premium), YouTube's subscription service. The show "follows DanTDM and his group of animated friends as they battle to keep their live show on the road".

In 2019, Middleton ranked 41 in UK's Top 100 Influencer List by The Sunday Times, which also estimated Middleton's net worth to be £25 million.

Middleton appeared at TommyInnit & Friends (and enemy's) Live at Brighton Dome on 1st July 2021.

Filmography

Film

Television

Video games

Awards and nominations 
 Guinness World Record for "Most goals scored in a game of Rocket League for a team of 2" (shared with Tom "Syndicate" Cassell) and "Most goals scored in a game of Rocket League (team of three)".
 Guinness World Record for "Most views for a dedicated Minecraft video channel".
 Nickelodeon Kids' Choice Awards in the category UK Favourite Tipster: 2015 and 2016.
 Nickelodeon Kids' Choice Awards in the category UK Favourite Gamer 2020.

Publications

Notes

References

External links
 
 
 

1991 births
21st-century English male writers
21st-century English novelists
English male voice actors
English male web series actors
English YouTubers
Let's Players
Living people
Mass media people from Aldershot
Video game commentators
Twitch (service) streamers
YouTube channels launched in 2012
Gaming YouTubers
Commentary YouTubers
People from Wellingborough
Minecraft YouTubers